Border Cafe is a 1937 American Western film directed by Lew Landers and starring Harry Carey.

Plot
Keith Whitney, the son of a wealthy senator, travels to the western part of the country to purchase a ranch. After losing his money at a cafe near the border, he is taken in by a rancher named Tex, who offers him refuge and makes him a partial owner of the ranch. When Keith's father and girlfriend are kidnapped, Tex and Keith team up to rescue them. Along the way, Keith transforms from an intoxicated patron to a hero, and ultimately helps to save the day.

Cast
 Harry Carey as Tex Stevens
 John Beal as Keith Whitney
 Armida as Dominga
 George Irving as Senator Henry Whitney
 Leona Roberts as Mrs. Emily Whitney
 J. Carrol Naish as ''Rocky Alton
 Marjorie Lord as Janet Barry
 Lee Patrick as Ellie
 Paul Fix as "Doley" Dolson
 Max Wagner as Shakey, Rocky's Henchman
 Walter Miller as Evans, Rocky's Henchman

See also
 List of American films of 1937
 Harry Carey filmography

References

External links

 Border Cafe in the Internet Movie Database
 
 
 

1937 films
Films directed by Lew Landers
American black-and-white films
RKO Pictures films
1937 Western (genre) films
American Western (genre) films
1930s English-language films
1930s American films